Peters Mountain is a  mountain in the U.S. states of Virginia and West Virginia. It is located on the border between Alleghany County, VA, Monroe County, WV, Giles Co.,VA, and Craig Co.,VA. It produces some of the water supply for Monroe County.

There are numerous sandstone outcroppings along the crest of the Peters Mountain and a number of high mountain bogs on Pine Swamp Ridge. The Mountain is primarily forested with upland oak, yellow poplar, red oak, and hickory.

The mountain was named for Peter Wright, who settled by the mountain in Covington, Virginia in 1746.

The Appalachian Trail traverses part of the crest of Peters Mountain. The Allegheny Trail also reaches its southern terminus here at the state boundary.

It is managed by Jefferson National Forest.

References

Geology studies By M. S. Meadows.

Landforms of Alleghany County, Virginia
Landforms of Craig County, Virginia
Landforms of Giles County, Virginia
Landforms of Monroe County, West Virginia
Mountains of Virginia
Mountains of West Virginia